was a Japanese baseball pitcher.

He played for the Yomiuri Giants from 1960 to 1962, winning both the Central League Rookie of the Year Award and the Eiji Sawamura Award in his first season. The Giants won the Japan Series the next year, and traded him for Toshio Yanagida at the end of the 1962 season. Horimoto closed his playing career with the Orions franchise, and coached the Yokohama Taiyo Whales in two stints from 1977 to 1978 and 1991 to 1992. He then joined the Nippon Ham Fighters coaching staff for two seasons, 1993 and 1994, followed by a return to coaching in 1997 with the Uni-President Lions, a Chinese Professional Baseball League team. 

Horimoto died of pneumonia in Yokohama on January 14, 2012, at the age of 76.

References

External links

1935 births
2012 deaths
Deaths from pneumonia in Japan
Nippon Professional Baseball pitchers
Nippon Professional Baseball Rookie of the Year Award winners
Baseball people from Osaka Prefecture
Yomiuri Giants players
Daimai Orions players
Tokyo Orions players
Japanese expatriate baseball people in Taiwan